The Michigan State Spartans football program represents Michigan State University (MSU) in college football at the NCAA Division I Football Bowl Subdivision (FBS) level. The Spartans are members of the Big Ten Conference. Michigan State claims a total of six national championships, including two (1952, 1965) from major wire-service: AP Poll and/or Coaches' Poll. The Spartans have also won eleven conference championships, with two in Michigan Intercollegiate Athletic Association and nine in the Big Ten. 

Home games of the Spartans are played at Spartan Stadium, which is located on the main university campus. Spartan Stadium is consistently ranked among the NCAA's Top 25 in attendance. The Spartans are led by head coach Mel Tucker.

History

Early years
Starting as a club sport in 1885, football gained varsity status in 1896. Early teams at the then Michigan Agricultural College (MAC) competed in the Michigan Intercollegiate Athletic Association (MIAA), which was chartered in 1888 and is the oldest existing collegiate leagues in the United States. Previously, in 1884, Albion College and Michigan Agricultural had played in the first intercollegiate football game held within the state of Michigan. MIAA's other charter members included Albion, Olivet and Hillsdale Colleges. The association's first season of competitive football was in 1894 which by then also included Eastern Michigan University (then Michigan Normal School) and Alma College; Kalamazoo College was added in 1896. In those early years the MAC Aggies could only accomplish one outright league football championship (1905) and share another with Albion (1903). The first decade of the 20th century generally saw the MIAA and MAC being dominated by either Albion or Olivet Colleges. MSU left the league and became an independent in 1907.

Chester Brewer revolutionized the football program during three different stints as head coach: 1903–10, 1917, and 1919. Considered a defensive genius, his teams posted shutouts in 49 of the 88 games he coached. John Macklin took over as head coach in 1911 and owned a winning percentage of .853 (29–5), which is the highest in Michigan State history.

Jim Crowley, one of Notre Dame's immortal Four Horsemen, served as the head football coach at Michigan State from 1929 to 1933. Charlie Bachman, another Notre Dame alumnus, succeeded Jim Crowley as head football coach at Michigan State, coming to East Lansing after a successful stint at Florida. A teammate of Knute Rockne, Bachman employed the Notre Dame system and forged 10 winning seasons in 13 years.

Clarence "Biggie" Munn era (1947–1953) 

Clarence Lester "Biggie" Munn took over as head coach of Michigan State from Charlie Bachman in 1947. His 1951 and 1952 squads won national championships. Munn retired from coaching in 1953 to assume duties as Michigan State's athletic director, a position he held until 1971. Each year, the Michigan State Spartans football team hands out the "Biggie Munn Award" to the team's most motivational player. MSU's Munn Ice Arena, built in 1974, is named in his honor. Munn was inducted into the College Football Hall of Fame as a coach in 1959, and, in 1961, he became Michigan State's first inductee into the Michigan Sports Hall of Fame. He authored the coaching textbook Michigan State Multiple Offense in 1953.

 1947–1950 In 1947, Munn and the Michigan State administration, led by university president John A. Hannah, approached Notre Dame president Father Cavanaugh to have his Fighting Irish play the Spartans for the first time since 1921. MSU initially offered to let Notre Dame take 80 percent of the gate, but Cavanaugh insisted they split the receipts down the middle. Munn was the only coach to beat Notre Dame head coach Frank Leahy three years in a row (1950–52). Starting with a 33–14 win over William & Mary in East Lansing on October 14, 1950, Biggie Munn started his historic 28-game winning streak.
 1951 The 1951 team went undefeated and were elected the National Champions by the Helms Athletic Foundation; however, the rest of the polls voted for the Tennessee Volunteers, who lost in the Sugar Bowl to the Maryland Terrapins, but postseason games did not count at the time.
 1952 The 1952 squad continued Munn's undefeated streak going 9–0. Michigan State won a national championship for the second year in a row and for the first time in school history were voted No. 1 in both the AP and Coaches' polls. Munn was named the AFCA Coach of the Year, coaching MSU to 9–0 record and a national championship.
 1953 In 1953, Michigan State's first year of conference play in the Big Ten, the Spartans shared the conference title with Illinois and went to the Rose Bowl, where they beat UCLA, 28–20. On October 24, 1953, Purdue upset the Spartans 6–0, ending Munn's 28-game winning streak. The Spartans won the first ever Paul Bunyan Trophy after beating rival Michigan 14–6 in East Lansing.

Shortly after the Rose Bowl victory, MSU's athletic director, Ralph H. Young retired. Munn stepped down from coaching to assume duties as athletic director and remained in that position until 1971. Munn named his assistant, Duffy Daugherty, as his successor to helm the football team. During his tenure as Michigan State's head football coach, Munn tutored 17 All-Americans. His teams have retained the school's top four season marks for rushing-yards-per-game: 1948 (304.5 yards/game), 1951 (293.9 yards), 1952 (272.4), and 1950 (269.3). Munn was inducted into the College Football Hall of Fame in 1959.

During the 1950s when Detroit was known as the world's leading automobile manufacturer, Michigan State was often referred to as the nation's "football factory." During this era, the Spartans produced great players such as Lynn Chandnois, Dorne Dibble, Don McAulliffe, Tom Yewcic, Sonny Grandelius, Bob Carey, Don Coleman, Earl Morrall and Dean Look.

Duffy Daugherty era (1954–1972) 

Duffy Daugherty replaced Biggie Munn in December 1953, following Munn's retirement to become Michigan State's athletic director. Daugherty would serve as the head coach at Michigan State University from 1954 to 1972, where he compiled a career record of 109–69–5. Duffy's 1965 and 1966 teams won national championships. Duffy's tenure of 19 seasons at the helm of the Michigan State Spartans football team is the longest of any head coach in the program's history. He was inducted into the College Football Hall of Fame in 1984.

 1954–1964 After compiling a disappointing 3–6 record in Daugherty's first season in 1954, the Spartans improved and finished second in the Big Ten behind Ohio State in 1955 with an 8–1 record in the regular season. Michigan State received the conference's invitation to the 1956 Rose Bowl instead of the Buckeyes due to the conference's prohibition against consecutive trips to the Rose Bowl. In Pasadena, the Spartans defeated UCLA, 17–14, for their second bowl win in school history. From 1956 to 1964, Daugherty's Michigan State teams were usually good, three times placing second in Big Ten, but never captured the conference crown. The Spartans did, however, beat Notre Dame eight straight times between 1955 and 1963, a feat matched only by Michigan (1887–1908) and USC (2002–2009). On November 5, 1964, the NCAA found Daugherty's program at Michigan State guilty of NCAA infractions prior to and during the 1957, 1958, and 1959 seasons. Daughtery's football program was put on probation for three years following the 1964 decision.
 1965–1966 The 1965 and 1966 seasons were the high points in Daugherty's coaching tenure, if not in the history of Michigan State football. The 1965 team finished the regular season 10–0 and ranked first in the country, but was upset by UCLA in the 1966 Rose Bowl, 14–12. Nevertheless, Michigan State was named national champions by the UPI and the National Football Foundation. The 1966 team began the season 9–0 and headed into their final game ranked No. 2 against No. 1 Notre Dame at Spartan Stadium on November 19. The No. 1 vs. No. 2 showdown, dubbed "The Game of the Century" by national media, ended in a 10–10 tie. The Spartans did not play in a bowl game following the 1966 season due to Big Ten rules in place at the time that prohibited its teams from playing in the Rose Bowl in consecutive years and barred participation in any other bowl. Notre Dame and Michigan State were declared co-national champions of the 1966 season as a result of the 10–10 tie.
 1967–1972 Beginning with the 1967 season, there was a decline in the Spartans football program under Duffy. Daugherty's teams in the late 60s and early 70s consistently hovered around the .500 mark, with only his 1971 squad finishing with a winning record (6–5). Under pressure from MSU's administration, Daugherty retired after the 1972 season and was succeeded as head coach by Denny Stolz.

During Daugherty's time in East Lansing, he recruited and coached some of the best players in Michigan State's history, including Herb Adderley, Brad Van Pelt, Bubba Smith, George Webster, Joe DeLamielleure, and Billy Joe DuPree who is recognized as the greatest tight end in Michigan State history. He was one of the first college football coaches to field a racially integrated team.

George Perles era (1983–1994) 

After returning from US Army active duty, George Perles returned to Michigan, where he enrolled at Michigan State University and played football under legendary coach Duffy Daugherty. Perles played the 1958 season before his playing career was cut short by a knee injury. Perles then started his football coaching career as a graduate assistant at Michigan State before moving on to the high school ranks in Chicago and Detroit, where his St. Ambrose High School team won their first Detroit City League Championship in 1961. Perles returned to Michigan State as defensive line coach under his mentor, Daugherty.

In 1972, Chuck Noll, head coach of the Pittsburgh Steelers, offered Perles the position of defensive line coach. In Perles’ first season, the Steelers made the NFL playoffs for the second time in franchise history, the first since 1947, losing to the Miami Dolphins in the AFC Championship Game. In 1974, the Steelers won the first of six consecutive AFC Central division championships and also their first Super Bowl. Perles became the defensive coordinator for the Steelers in 1978 and then assistant head coach under Noll in 1979. During Perles' ten years with Pittsburgh (1972–1981), the Steelers won a then-record four Super Bowls and became known as the team of the decade for the 1970s, largely on the back of their "Stunt 4-3" defense designed by Perles.

Perles returned to Michigan State University on December 3, 1982. In 12 years, he led the Spartans to two Big Ten Conference titles, seven bowl games and a victory in the 1988 Rose Bowl. The 1987 season marked the Spartans' last outright Big Ten title until 2013. During the 1987 season Perles and Michigan State beat Southern California twice in the same season, once in the regular season and one in the Rose Bowl.

During 1994–1995, an extensive external investigation conducted by the law firm of Bond, Schoeneck & King, PLLC. uncovered various infractions including grade tampering by an athletic department administrator. MSU president M. Peter McPherson fired Perles before the end of the 1994 season, and ordered the Spartans to forfeit their five wins for that season.  Perles was found "not culpable". Many fans and alumni believed he was treated unfairly. He later went on to be the founder of The Little Caesars Pizza Bowl and served on the MSU board of trustees. Perles died in January 2020.

Nick Saban era (1995–1999) 

When Nick Saban arrived in East Lansing, Michigan, prior to the 1995 season, MSU had not had a winning season since 1990, and the team was sanctioned by the NCAA for recruiting violations committed under his predecessor and former mentor, George Perles.

 1995–1997 – Beginning in 1995, Saban moderately improved MSU's fortunes, taking the Spartans to minor bowl games (all of which they lost by double-digit margins) in each of his first three seasons. From 1995 to 1997, Michigan State finished 6-5-1, 6–6, and 7–5. In comparison, MSU had finished 5–6, 6–6 and 5–6 (prior to NCAA forfeits) in 1992–1994.
 1998 – On November 7, 1998, the Spartans upset the No. 1 ranked Ohio State 28–24 at Ohio Stadium. However, even after the upset and an early-season rout of then-highly ranked Notre Dame the Spartans finished 6–6, including three last-minute losses featuring turnovers, defensive lapses, and special-teams misplays, and failed to earn a bowl invitation.
 1999 – Saban led the Spartans to a 9–2 season that included wins over Notre Dame, Michigan, Ohio State, and Penn State. Conversely, the two losses were routs at the hands of Purdue and Wisconsin. Following the final regular-season game against Penn State, Saban abruptly resigned to accept the head coaching position with LSU. Saban's assistant head coach and successor, Bobby Williams, then coached MSU to a Citrus Bowl victory over Florida, giving the Spartans an overall record of 10–2 for the 1999 season. It would be the best season in terms of wins for the Spartans since 1965, and it would see the Spartans reach their highest ranking since the 1966 team. Future former NFL Head Coach Josh McDaniels served as a graduate assistant on Saban's 1999 coaching staff.

Saban never won a bowl game in his tenure at Michigan State, going 0–3 and losing those bowl contests by a combined 85 points.

Mark Dantonio era (2006–2019) 

On November 27, 2006, Mark Dantonio was hired from the University of Cincinnati to become Michigan State's new football head coach. Dantonio served as an assistant coach at MSU from 1995 to 2000 and was Ohio State's defensive coordinator during their 2002 national championship season.  Dantonio was also an assistant at Kansas and Youngstown State University. In 2010, Dantonio led MSU to earn a share of the Big Ten Championship after finishing the year in a three-way tie with Ohio State and Wisconsin. His 2011 team won their division and appeared in the inaugural Big Ten Football Championship Game. His Spartans would win outright Big Ten Championships in 2013 and 2015 with victories in the 2013 and 2015 Championship Games. He has compiled an 8–4 record against the arch-rival Michigan. Michigan State's streak of four wins in a row, from the 2008 season through 2011, tied Michigan State's best in the rivalry. Dantonio's record also includes a 4–4 mark for the Megaphone Trophy, which goes to the winner of the Notre Dame rivalry game. Since leading Michigan State to a College Football Playoff berth in 2015, Dantonio compiled a 24–23 (15–18 in conference games) record.

He is considered a defensive-minded coach and has been on the coaching staffs of Glen Mason, Jim Tressel and Nick Saban. On September 21, 2019, Dantonio became Michigan State's winningest coach with a 31–10 victory over Northwestern that gave him his 110th win at the program and moved him past Duffy Daugherty. As of February 2018, his contract was set to run through 2024. Dantonio made approximately $4.3 million annually. On February 4, 2020, Dantonio announced that he would be stepping down as head coach and planned to move into a different role in the athletic department.

Mel Tucker era (2020–present) 
On February 12, 2020, Mel Tucker was hired from the University of Colorado to become Michigan State's new football head coach. Tucker served as a graduate assistant at MSU from 1997 to 1998, and also had stops as Ohio State's co-defensive coordinator in 2004, assistant head coach at Alabama in 2015, as well as the defensive coordinator for Georgia from 2016 to 2018. He was also an assistant at Miami (OH) and LSU. Tucker also served as defensive coordinator for the Cleveland Browns, Chicago Bears, and the Jacksonville Jaguars of the NFL, and he also served as interim head coach of the Jaguars in 2011.

Conference affiliations 
 Michigan Intercollegiate Athletic Association (1896–1906)
 Independent (1907–1952)
 Big Ten Conference (1953–present)

Championships

National championships
Michigan State has won six national championships from NCAA-designated major selectors, including two from the major wire-service AP Poll and/or Coaches' Poll in 1952 and 1965. Michigan State claims all six championships. The 1952, 1965, and 1966 titles are regarded as consensus national champions by NCAA designation.

Conference championships
Michigan State has won 11 conference championships, seven outright and four shared.

† Co-champions

Division championships

† Co-champions

Bowl games

Michigan State has appeared in 30 bowl games, garnering a 14–16 record.

Head coaches
List of Michigan State head coaches.
Mark Dantonio is Michigan State’s all-time winningest coach with 114 wins. Duffy Daughtery was the longest tenured coach at 19 years. Daugherty won four national titles while Clarence Munn won two; no other MSU coach has won a title. Munn leads coaches since 1940 with a .846 winning percentage.

* The Big Ten split into the Leaders and Legends Divisions with the addition of Nebraska for the 2011 season. Michigan State played in the Legends Division from 2011 to 2013. In 2014, with the addition of Maryland and Rutgers, the divisions were realigned and Michigan State now plays in the East Division.

Facilities

Spartan Stadium

Until the 1920s, the Spartans played on Old College Field just northwest of the current stadium. In the early 1920s school officials voted to construct a new stadium. The new College Field was ready in the fall of 1923 with a capacity of 14,000. In 1935 the seating capacity was increased to 26,000 and the facility was dedicated as Macklin Field. By 1957, upper decks were added to the east and west sides, boosting the capacity to 76,000. That same season Michigan State dropped the name Macklin Stadium in favor of the current name, Spartan Stadium.

In 2005 the university finished a new $64 million expansion project to Spartan Stadium. It featured the addition of nearly 3,000 club seats in the "Spartan Club," 24 suites and a 193-seat press box, bringing the current stadium capacity to 75,005. The original World War II-era terracotta cast of "The Spartan" statue was moved indoors to the atrium of the new structure to protect it from the elements and occasional vandalism, and a new bronze cast was made for outdoors. The  addition also houses the MSU Alumni Office, University Development, Career Services and other units.

The stadium boasts a capacity of 75,005, making it the Big Ten's 6th largest stadium and 23rd largest college football stadium in the country. In 2010 Spartan Stadium had the 19th highest attendance in NCAA Division I FBS. Crowd noise in the stadium gets so loud that Stanley Kubrick’s Spartacus (1960) uses a recording of the crowd noise during the 1959 Michigan State-Notre Dame game.

For the 2007 season, the student section held approximately 13,000 fans. Like the basketball student section (the Izzone), the Michigan State Student Alumni Foundation used to oversee a subgroup in the football student section named "Corner Blitz." When head coach Mark Dantonio took over the football program in 2006, "Corner Blitz" was united with the normal student section. The entire student section now receives a special T-shirt which is voted on annually.

Three new video boards were installed prior to the 2012 season. When combined, the three boards measure , making it the largest combined board system in the country.

Duffy Daugherty Building / Skandalaris Center
In 2007 Michigan State expanded its Duffy Daugherty Football Building with a $15 million expansion and renovation project. The face-lift started with construction of the  Skandalaris Football Center that features new team, staff and position meeting rooms, coaches' offices, MSU football Players Lounge and The Demmer Family Hall of History. MSU alumni Robert and Julie Skandalaris of Bloomfield Hills, Mich., donated $5 million as the lead gift for the $15 million project. The complex includes a  indoor practice facility with a full in-door football field, two outdoor practice football fields and a training room with a rehab and hydrotherapy section. Graphics in the space were provided by Ohio-based environmental designer, Ze Design.

Rivalries

Notre Dame

The Megaphone Trophy is awarded each year to the winner of the football game between Notre Dame and Michigan State. The rivalry includes games such as a 1966 "Game of the Century," often considered as one of the greatest college football games ever played. Notre Dame leads the series 48–28–1 through the 2021 season. The teams are next scheduled to play in 2026.

Indiana

The Old Brass Spittoon is presented to the winner of the Indiana–Michigan State football game and was first presented in 1950. After facing each other in one of the so-called protected cross-division rivalry games from 2011 to 2013, MSU and Indiana continue to face off each year as members of the Big Ten East division. MSU holds the trophy, and MSU leads the all-time series 49–17-2 through 2021.

Michigan

The Paul Bunyan-Governor of Michigan Trophy is a college rivalry trophy awarded to the winner of the annual football game between Michigan and Michigan State. Michigan won the 2022 game in Ann Arbor by a score of 29-7. Michigan leads the trophy series 39-29-2 through the 2022 season.

Penn State

Michigan State and Penn State play for the Land Grant Trophy, so named because Penn State University and Michigan State University are the nation's oldest land-grant universities as founded in 1855. When Penn State joined the Big Ten Conference in 1993, the Nittany Lions and Spartans have played each other for the trophy in the last week of conference play until the 2010 season. The trophy, designed by former Michigan State coach George Perles, features pictures of Penn State's Old Main and Michigan State's Beaumont Tower. After spending the 2011 to 2013 seasons in opposite Big Ten conference divisions, MSU and PSU resumed playing each other annually for the trophy in 2014.  The series is tied at 18–18-1 through the 2022 season.

Game of the Century

 
The 1966 Michigan State vs. Notre Dame football game ("The Game of the Century") remains one of the greatest, and most controversial, games in college football history. The game was played in Michigan State's Spartan Stadium on November 19, 1966. Michigan State entered the contest 9–0 and ranked No. 2, while Notre Dame entered the contest 8–0 and ranked No. 1. Notre Dame elected not to try for the end zone on the final series, thus the game ended in a 10–10 tie with both schools recording national championships.

Irish quarterback Terry Hanratty was knocked out after getting sacked in the first quarter by Spartan defensive lineman Bubba Smith. Starting Notre Dame running back Nick Eddy was out entirely after hurting his shoulder getting off the train in East Lansing. Michigan State held a 10–0 lead by early in the second quarter. But the Irish came back, scoring a touchdown right after Michigan State's field goal and tied the game on the first play of the fourth quarter. Notre Dame had the ball on its own 30-yard line with 1:10 to go, needing about 40 yards for a game-winning field goal. But Notre Dame coach Ara Parseghian chose to run the clock out, not wanting to risk a turnover, preserving the tie and Notre Dame's No. 1 ranking. The game ended in a 10–10 tie.

Notre Dame beat Rose Bowl bound USC 51–0 in Los Angeles the next week, completing an undefeated regular season and moving them to No. 1 in both polls. The Irish did not accept bowl bids until 1969, and Michigan State was the victim of a pair of Big Ten rules that would be rescinded a few years later: The same school could not represent the league in the Rose Bowl in back-to-back seasons, and only the league Champions could accept a bowl bid, unless they refused the Rose Bowl bid or, because it was on probation, were prohibited from accepting the bid, which, in either case, would then go to the second-place team. So despite being Big Ten Champions and undefeated in the regular season, in each case for two seasons in a row, the Spartans could not play in the Rose Bowl.

For nearly 50 years, Parseghian has defended his end-of-the-game strategy, which left many fans feeling disappointed at the game not having some sort of resolution. College football expert Dan Jenkins lead off his article for Sports Illustrated by saying Parseghian chose to "Tie one for the Gipper." Others chided Notre Dame by calling them the "Tying Irish" instead of the "Fighting Irish."

The game was not shown live on national TV. Each team was allotted one national television appearance and two regional television appearances each season. Notre Dame had used their national TV slot in the season opening game against Purdue. ABC executives did not even want to show the game anywhere but the regional area, but pressure from the West Coast and the South (to the tune of 50,000 letters) made ABC air the game on tape delay.

The Sporting News named the 1966 Fighting Irish and 1965–66 Spartans the 11th and 13th greatest teams of the 20th century respectively.

Individual awards and honors

National award winners

Players

 Maxwell Award
1972: Brad Van Pelt

 Fred Biletnikoff Award
2002: Charles Rogers

 Paul Warfield Trophy
2002: Charles Rogers

 Outland Trophy
1949: Ed Bagdon

 UPI Lineman of the Year
1965: Bubba Smith

 Dick Butkus Award
1989: Percy Snow

 Lombardi Award
1989: Percy Snow

 Jim Thorpe Award
2013: Darqueze Dennard

 Jack Tatum Trophy
2013: Darqueze Dennard

 Johnny Unitas Golden Arm Award
2015: Connor Cook

 Doak Walker Award
2021: Kenneth Walker III

 Walter Camp Award
2021: Kenneth Walker III

Coaches

 AFCA Coach of the Year
1952: Clarence Munn
1955: Duffy Daugherty

 Eddie Robinson Coach of the Year
1965: Duffy Daugherty

 Sporting News Coach of the Year
1965: Duffy Daugherty
1978: Darryl Rogers

 Broyles Award
2013: Pat Narduzzi

Big Ten Conference honors

 Chicago Tribune Silver Football
1971: Eric Allen
1977: Larry Bethea
1987: Lorenzo White

 Player of the Year
1985: Lorenzo White
1987: Lorenzo White

 Offensive Player of the Year
1990: Tico Duckett (media)

 Quarterback of the Year 
2015: Connor Cook

 Running Back of the Year 
2021: Kenneth Walker III

 Offensive Lineman of the Year
1987: Tony Mandarich 
1988: Tony Mandarich 
1989: Bob Kula 
1997: Flozell Adams

 Receiver of the Year
2014: Tony Lippett 
2015: Aaron Burbridge

 Defensive Player of the Year
2009: Greg Jones (media)

 Defensive Back of the Year
2013: Darqueze Dennard
2014: Kurtis Drummond

 Defensive Lineman of the Year
2013: Shilique Calhoun
2018: Kenny Willekes

 Punter of the Year
2022: Bryce Baringer

 Freshman of the Year
1993: Reggie Garnett

 Coach of the Year
1974: Denny Stolz (media)
1977: Darryl Rogers (media)
1987: George Perles (media)
2003: John L. Smith (media)
2010: Mark Dantonio (media) 
2013: Mark Dantonio (media and coaches)
2021: Mel Tucker (media and coaches)

Consensus All-Americans
Through the 2022 season, there have been 33 consensus selections of which 11 were unanimous.

† Unanimous All-American

Team honors

Retired numbers

Notes

Michigan State's All-Time Team
Athlon Sports selection of MSU's all-time team.

Offense
WR: Gene Washington 1964–66
WR: Andre Rison 1985–88
TE: Billy Joe DuPree 1970–72
E: Robert Carey 1949–51
OL: Sid Wagner 1933–35
OL: Don Coleman 1949–51
OL: Ed Bagdon 1946-49
OL: Ed Budde 1960–62
OL: Tony Mandarich 1985–88
OL: Flozell Adams 1994–97
QB: Earl Morrall 1953–55
QB: Steve Juday 1963–65
RB: John Pingel 1936–38
RB: Sonny Grandelius 1948–50
RB: Lorenzo White 1984–87
K: Morten Andersen 1978–81

Defense
DL: Blake Miller 1912–15
DL: Ed Bagdon 1946–49
DL: Bubba Smith 1964–66
DL: Larry Bethea 1974–77
LB: Dan Bass 1976–79
LB: Carl Banks 1980–83
LB: Percy Snow 1986–89
LB: Julian Peterson 1998–99
DB: Lynn Chandnois 1946–49
DB: George Saimes 1960–62
DB: George Webster 1964–66
DB: Brad Van Pelt 1970–72
P: Greg Montgomery 1985–87

Hall of Fame inductees

College Football Hall of Fame

14 former Michigan State players and coaches have been inducted into the College Football Hall of Fame, located in Atlanta, Georgia.

Pro Football Hall of Fame

Three former Michigan State players have been inducted into the Pro Football Hall of Fame, located in Canton, Ohio.

Canadian Football Hall of Fame

There are two Michigan State alumni inductees to the Canadian Football Hall of Fame.

Rose Bowl Hall of Fame
The Rose Bowl has inducted one Michigan State player into the Rose Bowl Game Hall of Fame.

Future opponents

Big Ten East-division opponents
Michigan State plays the other six Big Ten East opponents once per season.

Non-conference opponents
Announced schedules as of July, 2021.

References

External links

 

 
American football teams established in 1896
1896 establishments in Michigan